Eupithecia hastaria is a moth in the family Geometridae described by William Warren in 1906. It is found in Brazil and Argentina.

Subspecies
Eupithecia hastaria hastaria
Eupithecia hastaria tango Kocak, 2004

References

Moths described in 1906
hastaria
Moths of South America